Sigedang is a village in Kejajar District, Wonosobo Regency in Central Java Province. Its population is 2916.

Climate
Sigedang has a subtropical highland climate (Cfb). It has moderate rainfall from June to September and heavy to very heavy rainfall from October to May.

References

Villages in Central Java